South Londonderry was a UK Parliament constituency in Ireland. It returned one Member of Parliament (MP) to the British House of Commons from 1885 until it was abolished in 1922.

Boundaries and boundary changes
This county constituency comprised the southern part of County Londonderry.  Its official title was the South Derry division of county Londonderry.

1885–1922: The barony of Loughinsholin, and that part of the barony of Coleraine not contained within the Division of North Derry.

Prior to the 1885 United Kingdom general election and after the dissolution of Parliament in 1922 the area was part of the Londonderry constituency.

Politics
The constituency was a majority unionist area.

All three candidates in 1918 were Roman Catholics. Had the Sinn Féin candidate won, then instead of taking up the Westminster seat he would have participated in the revolutionary First Dáil.

Members of Parliament

Elections
The elections in this constituency took place using the first past the post electoral system.

Elections in the 1880s

Elections in the 1890s

Elections in the 1900s

Elections in the 1910s

Gordon is appointed a judge, prompting a by-election.

Elections in the 1920s
Henry is appointed Lord Chief Justice of Northern Ireland, prompting a by-election.

Chichester dies, causing a by-election.

References

Redistribution of Seats Act, Seventh Schedule, Part III - Ireland, in The Public General Acts of the United Kingdom of Great Britain and Ireland passed in the forty-eighth and forty-ninth years of Her Majesty Queen Victoria

External links
 Dáil Éireann Members Database Houses of the Oireachtas
 Dáil Debates - Díospóireachtaí Dála Houses of the Oireachtas
 Redistribution of Seats Act, Seventh Schedule - Part III - Ireland, County of Londonderry Redistribution of Seats Act, 1885 (from Internet Archive)

See also
 List of UK Parliament Constituencies in Ireland and Northern Ireland
 Redistribution of Seats (Ireland) Act 1918
 List of MPs elected in the 1918 United Kingdom general election
 List of Dáil Éireann constituencies in Ireland (historic)
 Members of the 1st Dáil
 South Londonderry (NI Parliament constituency)

South Londonderry
Dáil constituencies in Northern Ireland (historic)
Constituencies of the Parliament of the United Kingdom established in 1885
Constituencies of the Parliament of the United Kingdom disestablished in 1922